The London System, also known as the Mason Variation, is an  in chess where White opens with 1.d4 but does not play the Queen's Gambit, instead opting to rapidly develop the . The London System can be used against virtually any Black defense and thus comprises a smaller body of opening theory than many other openings.

The rapid  of the dark-squared bishop in the London System can be contrasted to the Colle System, in which the queen's bishop often remains on c1 during the opening phase of the game.

Origin
British player James Mason was the first well-known proponent of the London System. His contemporaries include Johannes Zukertort, Adolf Anderssen, and William Steinitz. The London System came to prominence in an international tournament held in Central Hall, Westminster from July 31 to August 19, 1922, which would later be known as the 1922 London tournament.

The London System came into fashion as a way of countering the Orthodox Queen's Gambit Declined and the hypermodern setups that began rising in popularity during the 1920s, such as the King's Indian Defense. Many of the games in the 1922 London tournament featured the Queen's Indian Defense, Rubinstein Variation, where White plays Bg5 to pin the knight, Nc3 and c4, arguably overextending pieces too early in the game. Later on in the tournament, players began playing Bf4 and c3. The line gives White a  position, and critics of the line referred to it as the "old man’s variation" or the "boring system". Even so, the opening can lead to  attacks. Vlatko Kovačević and David Bronstein are among the sharp tactical players who have played the London System.

Sverre Johnsen and Vlatko Kovačević, in the introduction to their 2005 book Win with the London System, state: Essentially, the London is a set of solid lines where after 1.d4 White quickly develops their dark-squared bishop to f4 and normally bolsters their centre with [pawns on] c3 and e3 rather than expanding. Although it has the potential for a quick kingside attack, the white forces are generally flexible enough to engage in a battle anywhere on the board. Historically it developed into a system mainly from three variations: 
1.d4 d5 2.Nf3 Nf6 3.Bf4
1.d4 Nf6 2.Nf3 e6 3.Bf4 
1.d4 Nf6 2.Nf3 g6 3.Bf4

Principles
White should ideally develop their knights to f3 and d2, bishops to f4 and d3, and solidify the position with pawns on d4, e3, and c3.

Variations

Classical line

Traditionally, the London System is played 1.d4 and 2.Nf3, bringing out the knight first and delaying the development of the bishop. In essence, 2.Nf3 develops the king's knight to a natural square while also waiting to see how Black will react. This grants White flexibility to potentially transpose into other openings, including the Queen's Gambit with 3.c4, or the Colle System with 3.e3. Modern play has often stressed the immediate 2.Bf4, however, forcing Black to play the London System.

Black has many options here; 
3...c5, challenging the 
3...e6, solidifying, but blocking the light-squared bishop
3...Bf5, developing a piece
3...c6, solidifying
3...g6, preparing to fianchetto 
3...b6, preparing to fianchetto 
3...Nc6, pressuring the d4-square

The Modern London
Instead of developing 2.Nf3, White can opt to immediately play 2.Bf4. Much like the Bishop's opening, White develops the bishop before the knight, ignoring the opening principle of "knights before bishops".

Rapport–Jobava System

Named after grandmasters Richárd Rapport and Baadur Jobava, this system can be a surprise against Black, who will expect typical development and may have overinvested in an attack on the kingside.
1.d4 d5 2.Nc3 Nf6 3.Bf4
This position can also be reached via 1.d4 Nf6 2.Nc3 d5 3.Bf4. Black usually plays either 3...c5, 3...e6, 3...Bf5, 3...c6, 3...g6, 3...Nc6, or 3...a6.

1.d4 Nf6 2.Nf3 e6 3.Bf4
Black usually plays either 3...b6, 3...c5, or 3...d5, transposing above.

1.d4 Nf6 2.Nf3 g6 3.Bf4
Play often goes 3...Bg7 4.e3 d6 5.Be2 0-0 6.0-0. As is usual in the King's Indian, Black can strike in the centre with ...c5 or ...e5. After 6...c5 7.c3, Black often plays either 7...b6, 7...Qb6, 7...Nc6, 7...Be6, or 7...cxd4. Black can prepare ...e5 in a number of ways, usually starting with either 6...Nbd7, 6...Nc6, or 6...Nfd7.

Afterwards, if unimpeded by Black's moves, White ideally would like to build a pyramid of pawns centered on d4 and develop all minor pieces. This could be achieved in various orders, for example, 1.d4, 2.Bf4, 3.Nf3, 4.e3, 5.c3, 6.Nbd2, 7.Bd3.

Example games
 Gata Kamsky vs. Samuel Shankland, Sturbridge, MA 2014: 1.d4 Nf6 2.Bf4 d5 3.e3 e6 4.Nd2 c5 5.c3 Nc6 6.Ngf3 Bd6 7.Bg3 0-0 8.Bd3 Qe7 9.Ne5 Nd7 10.Nxd7 Bxd7 11.Bxd6 Qxd6 12.dxc5 Qxc5 13.Bxh7+ Kxh7 14.Qh5+ Kg8 15.Ne4 Qc4 16.Ng5 Rfd8 17.Qxf7+ Kh8 18.Qh5+ Kg8 19.Rd1! e5 20.Qf7+ Kh8 21.e4 Ne7 22.Qxe7 Bb5 23.Rd2 Qxa2 24.Qf7 Qa1+ 25.Rd1 Qxb2 26.Qh5+ Kg8 27.Qh7+ Kf8 28.Qh8+ Ke7 29.Qxg7+ Kd6 30.Rxd5+ Kc6 31.Qf6+ 
 Magnus Carlsen vs. Evgeny Tomashevsky, Wijk aan Zee NED 2016: 1.d4 Nf6 2.Nf3 e6 3.Bf4 b6 4.e3 Bb7 5.h3 Be7 6.Bd3 0-0 7.0-0 c5 8.c3 Nc6 9.Nbd2 d5 10.Qe2 Bd6 11.Rfe1 Ne7 12.Rad1 Ng6 13.Bxg6 hxg6 14.Bxd6 Qxd6 15.Ne5 g5 16.f4 gxf4 17.Rf1 Nd7 18.Qh5 Nf6 19.Qh4 Qd8 20.Rxf4 Ne4 21.Nxe4 Qxh4 22.Rxh4 dxe4 23.dxc5 bxc5 24.Rd7 Rab8 25.b3 a5 26.Rc7 a4 27.bxa4 Ba8 28.a5 Rb7 29.Rxc5 Ra7 30.Nc4  (Black resigns)

See also
 List of chess openings
 List of chess openings named after places

References

Further reading

Chess openings